The Open Directory License (ODL) is a public copyright license that was used by DMOZ for its content.

Unlike open source licenses, the Open Directory License expressly forbids its applicability to software or open content hosted elsewhere. Time Warner (via the Netscape Communications Corporation) owns the compilation copyright to its unique selection of website listings (links, titles and descriptions) in the open directory on dmoz.org. As a practical matter, this includes the layouts, and the categories, and does not extend to the content Dmoz links to, or the actual links themselves.

The Free Software Foundation describes the ODL as a non-free license, citing the right to redistribute a given version not being permanent, and the requirement to check for changes to the license.

External links 
 The Open Directory License
Public copyright licenses
License